The 2016 Tamworth Borough Council election took place on 5 May 2016 to elect members of Tamworth Borough Council in England. This was on the same day as other local elections. Overall turnout was 30.93%.

References

2016 English local elections
2016
2010s in Staffordshire